Cathy Jenéen Doe  (born November 13, 1970), also credited as Cathy Doe, is an American actress. She is best known for her recurring role as Simone Russell on NBC's Passions. She most recently guest starred in the hit TV show Glee. She also appeared in several small feature films and many national television commercials.

Film and television roles

Film
Expecting Love (2008) as Chloe
Buds For Life (2004) as Reese Foster
Five Years (2003) as Renaye Upchurch

Television
Passions  (2004–2007) as Simone Russell
Ed (2002) as singing girl
Go Fish (2001) as Lori

External links 

Newcomer is Passions' New Simone -SoapCentral article about Doe joining the show

American soap opera actresses
American film actresses
American television actresses
African-American actresses
Actresses from Tallahassee, Florida
Living people
1970 births
University of Florida alumni
21st-century American actresses
21st-century African-American women
21st-century African-American people
20th-century African-American people
20th-century African-American women